Tower Building may refer to:
(sorted by state, then city/town)

Tower Building of the Little Rock Arsenal, listed on the National Register of Historic Places (NRHP) in Pulaski County, Arkansas
Tower Building (Little Rock, Arkansas), listed on the NRHP in Pulaski County (not the same building as the Tower Building of the Little Rock Arsenal)
Tower Building (Washington, D.C.), listed on the NRHP in Washington, D.C.
Tower Building (South Bend, Indiana), listed on the NRHP in St. Joseph County
Tower Building, Liverpool, England
Tower Building (Jackson, Mississippi), a Mississippi Landmark
Tower Building (New York, New York)